Yury Nikolayevich Fedkin (born 6 October 1960) is a former Soviet sports shooter and Olympic champion. He won a gold medal in the 10 metre air rifle at the 1992 Summer Olympics in Barcelona.

References

1960 births
Living people
Russian male sport shooters
Soviet sportspeople
Shooters at the 1992 Summer Olympics
Olympic shooters of the Unified Team
Olympic gold medalists for the Unified Team
Olympic medalists in shooting

Medalists at the 1992 Summer Olympics